Hong Kong Girl Guides Association is the sole Guide organisation in Hong Kong. It was formally established in 1919 though the first Girl Guides Company was formed in 1916. The association became a full member of the World Association of Girl Guides and Girl Scouts in 1978. It serves 55,145 members.

Programme
There are six sections in the Guiding programme. 

 Happy Bee (快樂小蜜蜂) is a Parent-Child Programme for ages 4 to 6 years old
 Brownie (小女童軍), from 6 to 12 years old
 Guide (女童軍), from 10 to 18 years
 Ranger (深資女童軍), from 15 to 23 years old [1]
 Golden Guide (樂齡女童軍), over 60 years old
 Guider (女童軍領袖), volunteer leader, over 21 years old

 - includes Sea Rangers (15 to 23) and Air Rangers (17 to 23).

Happy Bee accepts both boys and girls.

Law, Promise and Motto

Guide Promise
I promise to do my best, to be true to myself,
my God, and my country, and the country in which I live[2]
to help others, and to keep the Guide Law.

Note :
 - Choose either the word God or the word faith according to her personal convictions
 - for non-Chinese nationals residing in Hong Kong Special Administration Region

Happy Bee Promise
I am a Happy Bee.
I love my family.
I love my friends.
I love nature.

Guide Law
As a Guide [1]
I will be reliable, honest and trustworthy
I will use my resources wisely and help others
I will be true to myself and respect the opinion of others
I will face challenges and learn from my experiences
I will care for nature and all living things
I will be friendly and a sister to all Guides

 - For Rangers, the first line is "As a Ranger Guide"

Guide Motto
The Guide Motto is the same for all sections: Be Prepared (準備).

Symbol

The association's symbol is a stylized trefoil. The notched edges and the mauve colour recall the symbol flower of Hong Kong, the Bauhinia blakeana, while the colour red is seen as particularly auspicious. The internal division of the trefoil shows the Chinese character Kwong meaning a ray of light from a beacon, reflecting the spirit of the Guide movement.

Organisational Structure

Regions & Divisions
There are a total of 14 regions and divisions in the Hong Kong Girl Guides Association:

 Bauhinia Division (English Speaking Units);
 Island East Division; 
 Island West Division; 
 Kwun Tong Division; 
 Yau Tsim Mong Division; 
 Kowloon City Division; 
 Wong Tai Sin Division; 
 Sham Shui Po Division; 
 New Territories East Division; 
 New Territories South Division; 
 New Territories North Division; 
 Yuen Long Division; 
 Tuen Mun Division; and 
 Outlying Islands Division.

Each division is composed of various districts.

Chief Commissioners
Colony Commissioners:
 Lady Stubbs (1920-1925)
 Lady Southorn (1926-1936)
 Mary King MBE (1936-1940)
 W Buckwell (1940-1941)
 Dorothy Lee OBE, JP (1945-1946)
 Iris Herklots (1946-1948)
 Louise Landale (1948-1951)
 H Owen Hughes (1951-1958)
 Irene Hooton (1958-1961)
 Margaret Staple MBE (1961-1966)
 Pauline Stephens (1966-1968)
 S A Hill (1968-1972)
 Marguerite Gordon MBE, JP (1972-1978)

Chief Commissioners:
 Marguerite Gordon MBE, JP (1978-1980)
 Dr Sally Wong Leung GBS, OBE, JP (1980-1983)
 Lady Akers-Jones MBE, JP (1983-1994)
 Rita Suen JP (1994-1998)
 Dr Alice Lui (1998-2003)
 Julita Lee BBS, JP (2003-2008)
 Delia Pei BBS, JP (2008-2011)
 Josephine Pang MH (2011-2014)
 Daisy Ho (2014-2015)
 Pearl Lee (2015-2021)
 Jeanne Lee BBS, JP (2021-  )

See also

 Scout Association of Hong Kong
 Olympia Badge
 English-Speaking Guides Hong Kong

References

World Association of Girl Guides and Girl Scouts member organizations
Scouting and Guiding in Hong Kong
Youth organizations established in 1919
1919 establishments in Hong Kong